Tiana Tolstoi is an Egyptian-born French model of Korean, Serbian, and Russian descent.

Career 
Tolstoi was discovered on the street in Paris, France. Her first show was for Balenciaga. and she has also walked for Alexander McQueen, Alexander Wang, Marni, Stella McCartney and Versace. She was once signed with the now-defunct Trump Model Management. 

She has appeared in ads for Lancôme, Calvin Klein, and Jimmy Choo. 

Tolstoi has appeared in editorials for magazines such as Vogue Italia, V, and Numéro.

References 

1994 births
Living people
Models from Cairo
Models from Paris
French people of Korean descent
French people of Serbian descent
French people of Russian descent
French female models